Bellisima is a Venezuelan telenovela written by Alicia Barrios and broadcast on Venevisión in 1991 with a story set in the world of fashion. Emma Rabbe and Víctor Cámara starred as the main protagonists. The series lasted 187 episodes, and was distributed internationally by Venevisión International.

Synopsis
Bellisima takes place in the fascinating world of modeling, which is a chic, elegant, extravagant and sometimes frivolous world.

Ricardo Linares Rincon is the owner of a successful and exclusive modeling agency and a playboy with an easy-going personality. He suddenly meets Gabriella Gruber, an ambitious yet unassuming woman who has recently graduated from a Fashion Design school. Gabriela is ambitious and wants to succeed due to her talent rather than her beauty. The meeting between Ricardo and Gabriela will lead them down a path where an unknown past ties them together.

Cast
Emma Rabbe as Gabriela Gruber 
Víctor Cámara as Ricardo Linares
Belén Marrero as Sara
Daniel Alvarado as Arturo 
Elena Dinisio as Roxana 
Henry Galue as Aurelio 
Nancy Gonzalez as Consuelo 
Belen Marrero as Sara 
Carolina Muziotti as Estrella
Jose Vieira as Zurdo
Juan Iturbide as Federico
Lucy Orta as Eva
Susana Dujim as Susana
Carolina Motta as Marisol
Elizabeth Morales as Esther
Juan Carlos Vivas as Beiby
Asdrubal Blanco as Ruben
Dulce Maria Pilonietta as Vanessa
Belen Diaz as Elvira

See also
 List of telenovelas of Venevisión
List of programs broadcast by Venevision

References

External links
Bellisima at the Internet Movie Database
Opening Credits

1991 telenovelas
Venevisión telenovelas
Venezuelan telenovelas
1991 Venezuelan television series debuts
1992 Venezuelan television series endings
Spanish-language telenovelas
Television shows set in Venezuela